Sphere is a 1998 American science fiction psychological thriller film directed and produced by Barry Levinson, adapted by Kurt Wimmer, and starring Dustin Hoffman, Sharon Stone, and Samuel L. Jackson. Sphere is based on the 1987 novel of the same name by Michael Crichton. The film was released in the United States on February 13, 1998.

Plot 
A spacecraft, presumed to be of alien origin, is discovered on the floor of the Pacific Ocean, estimated to have been there for nearly 300 years. A team of experts, including marine biologist Dr. Beth Halperin, mathematician Dr. Harry Adams, astrophysicist Dr. Ted Fielding, psychologist Dr. Norman Goodman, and U.S. Navy Captain Harold Barnes, are assembled and taken to the Habitat, a state-of-the-art underwater living environment located near the spacecraft.

Upon examination of the spacecraft, they are perplexed to learn it is not alien at all, but rather American in origin. However, its technology far surpasses any in the present day. The ship's computer logs cryptically suggest a mission that originated either in the distant past or future, but the team manages to deduce that the long dead crew were tasked with collecting an item of scientific importance. 

Norman and Beth discover the ship's logs, with the last entry noting an "unknown event." A holographic re-enactment of the event reveals that hundreds of years in the future the ship encountered a black hole, which apparently led to the ship crash landing in the ocean, back in the 1700s. Soon after, Norman and the others eventually stumble upon a large, yet perfect sphere hovering in the cargo bay. They cannot find any way to probe the inside of the sphere, as the fluid surface seems to be impenetrable. Upon observation, Norman ominously notes the sphere reflects everything in the room except them.

Once they return to the Habitat, Harry hypothesizes that everyone on this team is fated to die. Harry notes that the black hole is referred to as an "unknown event" in the future logs. However, here in the present they have knowledge of the historic event, yet it's unable to be explained later on. During the night, Harry returns to the spacecraft and is able to enter the sphere. Norman follows after Harry, where he finds him unconscious next to the sphere and returns him to the Habitat. 

The next day, the crew discovers a series of numeric-encoded messages appearing on the computer screens; the crew is able to decipher them and comes to believe they are speaking to "Jerry", an alien intelligence from the sphere. They find Jerry is able to see and hear everything that happens on the Habitat.

A powerful typhoon strikes the surface, and the Habitat crew is forced to stay in the Habitat several more days. During that time, a series of tragedies strikes the crew, including attacks from aggressive jellyfish and a giant squid, and equipment failures in the base, which kill Ted and the team's support staff. The survivors, Beth, Harry, and Norman, believe Jerry is responsible. Norman discovers that they had misinterpreted the initial messages from Jerry, and that the entity speaking to them through the computers is actually Harry himself, transmitted from his mind while he is asleep. Norman and Beth eventually realize that when Harry entered the sphere, he gained the ability to make anything he imagines a reality and conclude that all the horrors that have befallen the Habitat were manifestations of Harry's fears.

Norman and Beth sedate Harry with enough sleeping drugs to put him into a dreamless sleep to prevent him from doing any further damage. When Norman is attacked by a snake, however, Beth realizes that Harry alone could not have been responsible for everything that had happened on the Habitat and confronts Norman, accusing him of entering the sphere when he went to retrieve Harry. Beth's suspicions prove to be correct, but after experiencing her own nightmarish vision, she confesses to Norman that she too entered the sphere. 

Upon being rejoined by Harry, the three of them realize that the crew of the ship must have also entered the sphere and ended up killing each other after being driven mad by their fears. Under the stress of the situation, Beth has suicidal thoughts which causes the detonation mechanisms on a store of explosives to engage, threatening to destroy the base and the spacecraft. They race to the Habitat's mini-sub, but their combined fears cause them to re-appear back in the spacecraft. As a psychologist, Norman is able to see through the illusion.  He triggers the mini-sub's undocking process and overrides the others' fears that they will not escape the destruction of the Habitat and spacecraft. The sphere is untouched by the explosions.

The mini-sub makes it to the surface as the surface ships return. As Beth, Harry, and Norman begin safe decompression, they realize that they will be debriefed and their newfound powers discovered. They agree to erase their memories of the event using their powers, ensuring the "unknown event" paradox is resolved. The sphere rises from the ocean and then accelerates off into space.

Cast 
 Dustin Hoffman as Dr. Norman Goodman
 Sharon Stone as Dr. Elizabeth "Beth" Halperin
 Samuel L. Jackson as Dr. Harry Adams
 Liev Schreiber as Dr. Ted Fielding
 Peter Coyote as Capt. Harold C. Barnes
 Queen Latifah as Alice "Teeny" Fletcher
 Marga Gómez as Jane Edmunds
 Huey Lewis as Helicopter pilot
 Bernard Hocke as Seaman
 James Pickens, Jr. as OSSA Instructor
 Michael Keys Hall as OSSA Official
 Ralph Tabakin as OSSA Official

Production 
Hoffman joined the cast because of Levinson's involvement. Hoffman and Levinson had collaborated on several prior projects, and Hoffman had faith that Levinson could raise the project beyond its script.  

Due to budgetary concerns, pre-production stopped in October 1996, and the script was revised. In the interim, Levinson directed Wag the Dog, which also starred Hoffman. 

Shooting on Sphere began in March 1997, with a budget that Variety estimates was $80 million. Shooting took place at a naval base on Mare Island in Vallejo, California. Principal photography ended in July 1997, after 68 days.

Release 
Sphere initially had a Christmas release date but was moved forward to avoid competition. Warner Bros. released the film theatrically in the US on February 13, 1998, where it debuted in third place and grossed $37 million in total.  Sphere did almost as well internationally, grossing $73.4 million worldwide.

Reception 
Sphere received mostly negative reviews from critics. The Los Angeles Times characterized it as a flop. 
On Rotten Tomatoes, the film has an approval rating of 13% based on 55 reviews, with an average score of 4/10; the site's critical consensus states, "Sphere features an A-level cast working with B-grade material, with a story seen previously in superior science-fiction films". On Metacritic, the film has a score of 35 out of 100, based on 21 critics, indicating "generally unfavorable reviews". Audiences surveyed by CinemaScore gave the film a grade "C−" on scale of A to F.

Todd McCarthy of Variety called it derivative of classic science fiction films and devoid of suspense.  Janet Maslin of The New York Times wrote, "While this is no quick-witted treat on a par with Mr. Levinson's Wag the Dog, it's a solid thriller with showy scientific overtones". 

Kenneth Turan of the Los Angeles Times wrote, "The more the movie explains itself, the more ordinary it becomes." Roger Ebert gave the film one and a half stars out of four and stated, " 'Sphere' feels rushed. The screenplay uses lots of talk to conceal the fact that the story has never been grappled with."

Soundtrack 

The score for Sphere was composed by Elliot Goldenthal.

Crew credits
 Music composed and produced by Elliot Goldenthal
 Orchestrated by Robert Elhai and Elliot Goldenthal
 Conducted by Stephen Mercurio and Jonathan Sheffer
 Recorded and mixed by Joel Iwataki
 Electronic music produced by Richard Martinez
 Film music editor: Curtis Roush
 Additional orchestrations by Deniz Hughes

Legacy 
Barry Levinson said he had been inspired to write the basic plot line for his subsequent film, Liberty Heights, based on a review of the film for Entertainment Weekly; its critic, Lisa Schwarzbaum, specified that Hoffman played "the empathetic Jewish psychologist. Okay, so he’s not officially Jewish; he’s only Hoffman, who arrives at the floating habitat and immediately announces, noodgey and menschlike, 'I’d like to call my family.' You do the math." Levinson remarked:

See also 
 Extraterrestrial life
 Grandfather paradox
 Predestination paradox
 Time travel
 Time travel paradox

References

External links 
 
 
 
 
 

1998 films
1998 science fiction films
American science fiction adventure films
American mystery thriller films
American psychological thriller films
American science fiction thriller films
1990s English-language films
Films about time travel
Films directed by Barry Levinson
Films based on works by Michael Crichton
Films scored by Elliot Goldenthal
Films with screenplays by Paul Attanasio
Films with screenplays by Kurt Wimmer
Metaphysical fiction films
Science fiction submarine films
Underwater action films
Warner Bros. films
1990s American films